Aries Delos Santos (born 18 December 1989) is a Filipino badminton player.

Career 
In 2015, he became the runner-up of Iran Fajr International tournament in men's doubles event. In the same year he plays for Egret Club in mixed doubles event at the Chicago Open and reached the third place. Now he works as a coach in Egret Badminton Club in Chicago.

Achievements

BWF International Challenge/Series 
Men's doubles

  BWF International Challenge tournament
  BWF International Series tournament
  BWF Future Series tournament

References

External links 
 
 
 

1989 births
Living people
Sportspeople from Pangasinan
Filipino male badminton players